Brad Morris (born August 16, 1975) is an American actor and television writer. He starred in Playing House and had recurring roles on Cougar Town as Jerry from 2013 to 2015, for which he also wrote five episodes, Great News from 2017 to 2018, and Dice from 2016 to 2017.

Early life
Morris was born in Chicago and is a 1998 alumnus of Skidmore College. He was working for The Second City before his TV career, writing and performing in up to eight live shows a week for several years. At The Second City, Morris also co-founded the comedy troupes the Reckoning, Stubs, and Uncle's Brother.

Filmography

References

External links

 

Living people
1975 births
21st-century American male actors
21st-century American writers
Skidmore College alumni